Mong La Township is a subdivision of Kengtung District, Shan State, Myanmar. The area borders China and Laos. The principal town is Mong La.

Sharing a border with China, the Mong La area is a center for the production and traffic of narcotics and illegal wildlife trade. It offers gambling and prostitution to Chinese tourists in an unregulated environment outside Myanmar government control.

History

The Mong La region was Special Region Number 4 of Shan before the new constitution (2008). It hosts the National Democratic Alliance Army (NDAA) and its leader Lin Mingxian aka Sai Leun. It was the #815 War Zone of the former Communist Party of Burma (CPB). In 2008 the United Wa State Army (UWSA) strongly opposed the move to give away the adjacent area of Mong Pawk from its control because it serves as a link with its ally, the NDAA in Mong La.

References

External links
Mong La’s Moveable Feast of Endangered Beasts
Mong La - Vice City

Populated places in Shan State
Townships of Myanmar